Soldier is a surname associated with the occupation of a soldier. Notable people with the surname include:

 Dave Soldier (born 1956), American composer
 Liaquat Soldier (1952–2011), Pakistani stage and television comedy actor, writer and director